State Road 536 (SR 536), named World Center Drive for its entire length, is an east-west state highway that extends from Interstate 4 (I-4) near the EPCOT theme park to SR 535 in Lake Buena Vista, with the road continuing east to SR 417 (The Central Florida GreeneWay) and International Drive.

Route description

SR 536 begins at an interchange with I-4/SR 400 in Lake Buena Vista, with the road continuing west into the Walt Disney World Resort as Epcot Center Drive and providing access to the Epcot theme park section of Disney World.  From this interchange it heads east as six-lane divided World Center Drive, passing by two resort hotels and a golf course before intersecting with SR 535.  At this intersection, SR 536 ends, with World Center Drive continuing east to International Drive and providing access to an interchange with northbound SR 417 (Central Florida GreeneWay), with the westbound lanes coming from a southbound exit of the Greeneway.

History
SR 536 was built in the early 1980s to serve the new Epcot theme park, opened October 1, 1982.  After the road was finished, all the land for it that had formerly been part of the Walt Disney World Resort was de-annexed from the City of Lake Buena Vista and the Reedy Creek Improvement District.

Major intersections

See also

References

External links

536
536
Lake Buena Vista, Florida